Ashley Holliday Tavares is an American actress. She is best known for playing Chloe Delgado on the 2010 ABC Family series Huge and Melissa Sanders on the 2012 Nick at Nite serial drama Hollywood Heights.

Personal life
Tavares attended the Los Angeles County High School for the Arts and DePaul University, where she studied theater.

Career
Tavares began her career with an appearance on an episode of Miami Vice in 1986. Her breakout role came in 2010, when Tavares landed a leading role in the ABC Family series Huge. She followed that with the role of Melissa Sanders on TeenNick's Hollywood Heights. Ashley has done voices on Robot Chicken and guest starred on shows such as Disney's K.C. Undercover, and The People v. O. J. Simpson: American Crime Story. In 2012, she made her film debut in The Man Who Shook the Hand of Vicente Fernandez.

Filmography

Film

Television series

Music videos
”flow” Brittany Underwood 2013

References

External links
 
 

Living people
20th-century American actresses
21st-century American actresses
Actresses from California
American child actresses
American film actresses
American television actresses
People from Burbank, California
American people of Cape Verdean descent
American people of Czech descent
Year of birth missing (living people)